A periplus, or periplous, is a manuscript document that lists the ports and coastal landmarks, in order and with approximate intervening distances, that the captain of a vessel could expect to find along a shore. In that sense, the periplus was a type of log and served the same purpose as the later Roman itinerarium of road stops. However, the Greek navigators added various notes, which, if they were professional geographers, as many were, became part of their own additions to Greek geography.

The form of the periplus is at least as old as the earliest Greek historian, the Ionian Hecataeus of Miletus. The works of Herodotus and Thucydides contain passages that appear to have been based on peripli.

Etymology
Periplus is the Latinization of the Greek word περίπλους (periplous, contracted from περίπλοος periploos), which is "a sailing-around." Both segments, peri- and -plous, were independently productive: the ancient Greek speaker understood the word in its literal sense; however, it developed a few specialized meanings, one of which became a standard term in the ancient navigation of Phoenicians, Greeks, and Romans.

Known peripli
Several examples of peripli that are known to scholars:

Carthaginian 

The Periplus of Himilco the Navigator, parts which are preserved in Pliny the Elder and Avienius.
The Periplus of Hanno the Navigator, Carthaginian colonist and explorer who explored the coast of Africa from present-day Morocco southward at least as far as Senegal in the sixth or fifth century BCE.

Greek 

The Periplus of the Greek Scylax of Caryanda, in Caria, who allegedly sailed down the Indus River and then to Suez on the initiative of Darius I. This voyage is mentioned by Herodotus, and his periplus is quoted by Hecataeus of Miletus, Aristotle, Strabo and Avienius.
The Massaliote Periplus, a description of trade routes along the coasts of Atlantic Europe, by anonymous Greek navigators of Massalia (now Marseille, France), possibly dates to the sixth century BCE, also preserved in Avienius
Pytheas of Massilia, (fourth century BCE) On the Ocean (Περί του Ωκεανού), has not survived; only excerpts remain, quoted or paraphrased by later authors, including Strabo, Diodorus Siculus, Pliny the Elder  and in Avienius' Ora maritima.
The Periplus of Pseudo-Scylax, generally is thought to date to the fourth or third century BCE.
The Periplus of Nearchus surveyed the area between the Indus and the Persian Gulf under orders from Alexander the Great. He was a source for Strabo and Arrian, among others.
On the Red Sea by Agatharchides. Fragments preserved in Diodorus Siculus and Photius.
 The Periplus of Scymnus of Chios is dated to around 110 BCE.
The Periplus of the Erythraean Sea or Red Sea was written by a Greek of the Hellenistic/Romanized Alexandrian in the first century CE. It provides a shoreline itinerary of the Red (Erythraean) Sea, starting at the port of Berenice. Beyond the Red Sea, the manuscript describes the coast of India as far as the Ganges River and the east coast of Africa (called Azania). The unknown author of the Periplus of the Erythraean Sea claims that Hippalus, a mariner, was knowledgeable about the "monsoon winds" that shorten the round-trip from India to the Red Sea. Also according to the manuscript, the Horn of Africa was called, "the Cape of Spices," and modern day Yemen was known as the "Frankincense Country."
The Periplus Ponti Euxini, a description of trade routes along the coasts of the Black Sea, written by Arrian (in Greek Αρριανός) in the early second century CE.
The Stadiasmus Maris Magni, it was written by an anonymous author and is dated to the second half of the third century AD.

Rahnāmag
Persian sailors had long had their own sailing guide books, called Rahnāmag in Middle Persian (Rahnāmeh رهنامه in Modern Persian).

They listed the ports and coastal landmarks and distances along the shores.

The lost but much-cited sailing directions go back at least to the 12th century. Some described the Indian Ocean as "a hard sea to get out of" and warned of the "circumambient sea," with all return impossible.

Tactic of naval combat
A periplus was also an ancient naval maneuver in which attacking triremes would outflank or encircle the defenders to attack them in the rear.

See also
 List of Graeco-Roman geographers

References

Bibliography

External links
 

History of navigation
 
Classical literature
Roman itineraries
Maps
Nautical reference works